Kwak Chul-Ho (born May 8, 1986) is a South Korean football player who currently plays for Daejeon Korail in the Korea National League. He formerly played for Daejeon Citizen in the K-League.

External links
 

1986 births
Living people
South Korean footballers
Daejeon Hana Citizen FC players
Gimcheon Sangmu FC players
Changwon City FC players
Daejeon Korail FC players
K League 1 players
Korea National League players
Association football forwards